Traditionally, retail home video releases of Saturday Night Live material have consisted of "Best Of" compilations, comprising select performances (typically sketches) of past cast members, and notable guest hosts. Beginning in 1999, DVD releases were distributed by Lionsgate Home Entertainment under license from NBC, predating the network's merger with Universal. Following the establishment of NBCUniversal in 2004, Universal Studios, owners of NBC, Saturday Night Live'''s broadcast home, ceased the existing arrangement of outside distribution of SNL material. While Lionsgate is no longer able to acquire new SNL-related content, they have retained reissuing rights to their existing SNL content library.

On December 5, 2006, Universal Pictures Home Entertainment released on DVD "Saturday Night Live: The Complete First Season," comprising complete episodes.  Upon the set’s release, some criticism of its authenticity as complete and uncut episodes arose from reviewers and fans. This was due to the existence of original live copies, which in comparison to the "complete" episodes reveal edits and omissions, which are common among the rerun versions of the shows in the set. Following the successful sales of the first season, the next four seasons have been released. No subsequent releases are planned for the near future, due to prohibitive music licensing costs and the rise of streaming video.

DVD releases
Seasons

Specials

1 Distributed by Lionsgate Home Entertainment 
2 Distributed by Universal Studios Home Entertainment 
3 Aspect ratio: 4:3 (fullscreen) 
4 Aspect ratio: 16:9 (widescreen) 
5 Released in Canada only

6 Distributed by Trimark Home Video

Episode downloads and online streaming

Following the creation of Hulu by NBC, among others, in March 2007, NBC owned content, including Saturday Night Live material, was removed from video sharing sites, notably YouTube, to the exclusion of NBC.com and the aforementioned Hulu. A notable exception to this are SNL Digital Shorts, created in conjunction by SNL Studios and The Lonely Island. Additionally, full seasons and specials have been released for sale on paid-content online media portals, including iTunes and Amazon.com. Free, ad-supported streaming of new Saturday Night Live episodes on NBC.com was announced on October 16, 2009.

Due to the region-specific nature of Hulu, the content is not accessible outside of the United States. In mid-2009 Broadway Video Enterprises formed a partnership with Sevenload to distribute Saturday Night Live'' digital content to online-viewers in Europe, Australia, and New Zealand.

References

DVDs